Siddharth Varadarajan (born 1965) is a journalist and editor in India. He was a former editor of the English language national daily The Hindu, and is one of the founding editors of the Indian digital news portal The Wire, along with Sidharth Bhatia, and M. K. Venu.

Early life, education and activism
Siddharth Varadarajan was born to an IAS officer, Muthusamy Varadarajan, and Usha, a businesswoman. He did his initial schooling at La Martiniere in Lucknow and Mayo College, Ajmer.

After 1978, Varadarajan studied at the Brockley County state school in London, his father having been appointed to a position at the Indian High Commission in London. He received an undergraduate degree in economics at the London School of Economics Left-wing politics in the UK came to influence his journalistic career. He received a Masters and PhD from Columbia University. While a student at Columbia University, he met his wife, Nandini Sundar.

Career

Media

Times of India
In 1995, Vardarajan returned to India to work as a journalist, before joining The Times of India as an editorial writer in 1995.

The Hindu
In 2004, he joined The Hindu, as Strategic Affairs editor, before going on to succeed Harish Khare as the Chief of National Bureau.

In May 2011, Varadarajan was appointed as The Hindus editor via an extraordinary general meeting called by the Board of Directors. He was the first editor to have been not drawn from the family of primary shareholders in its 150-year history.

On 21 October 2013, Varadarajan publicly announced his resignation from The Hindu, citing a change in policy by the owners of the newspaper to go back to being a family-run-and-edited newspaper.

During Vardarajan's tenure as the editor, Bharatiya Janata Party leader Subramanian Swamy filed a case in Delhi's High Court challenging his appointment as editor on the grounds that Varadarajan was not an Indian citizen, and further complained to the Ministry of Information and Broadcasting, Government of India. The petition was ultimately denied by the Delhi High Court. Varadarajan later claimed in an interview to Tehelka that Swamy had demanded more coverage in The Hindu of his statements through an intermediary, and that the court case was a mode of exacting revenge after Vardarajan rebuffed Swami.

The Wire
In 2015, Varadarajan along with Sidharth Bhatia and M. K. Venu founded the non-profit online news portal called The Wire; he continues as the Editor-in-Chief.

Academic positions

In 2007, Varadarajan was a visiting professor at the Graduate School of Journalism, University of California, Berkeley. In 2009, he was a Poynter Fellow at Yale University.

Other affiliations
Varadarajan is a member of the International Founding Committee of The Real News, and was, until 2015, a board member of the inter-governmental B.P. Koirala India-Nepal Foundation.

Until 2015, he was also a member of the Executive Council of the Maulana Abul Kalam Azad Institute of Asian Studies, and a member of the Indian Council of World Affairs. He continues as a member of the editorial board of India Quarterly: A Journal of International Affairs. and in 2019, joined the International Advisory Council of the Sydney-based Judith Neilson Institute of Journalism and Ideas.

Reception

Awards and Accolades

In November 2005, the United Nations Correspondents Association awarded Varadarajan the Elizabeth Neuffer Memorial Prize Silver Medal for Print Journalism for a series of articles, Persian Puzzle on Iran and the International Atomic Energy Agency. In March 2006, he was awarded the Bernardo O'Higgins Order by the President of Chile—that country's highest civilian honor for a foreign citizen—for his contributions to journalism and to the promotion of India's relations with Latin America and Chile.

In July 2010, he received the Ramnath Goenka award for Journalist of the Year (Print). He received the 2017 Shorenstein Journalism Award for outstanding reporting and for significant contributions to promoting freedom of the press in the Asia-Pacific region.

In May 2020, he is among 17 journalists from across the world recipients for the Germany based prestigious Deutsche Welle Freedom of Speech Award. The Freedom of Speech Award 2020 is for all courageous journalists worldwide who are suffering repressions because of their reporting on the pandemic.

Legal cases

On 31 March 2020, The Wire had published a news report on a Ram Navami fair being conducted amidst the coronavirus pandemic in Uttar Pradesh. The report had misattributed a quote to the Chief Minister Yogi Adityanath and the paragraph containing it was tweeted by Varadarajan. On the following day, the report was corrected and Varadarajan himself issued a clarification, attributing the quote to the Hindutva stalwart Acharya Paramhans. The Uttar Pradesh police registered a case against Varadarajan calling it an "objectionable article" and on a number of charges including promoting enmity, cheating by impersonation and creating false alarm leading to panic. The cases were filed after the correction and was followed by a tweet from Adityanath's media advisor who claimed that the action was taken because he had apparently not apologised or deleted the tweet, along with a warning that "[I]f you too are thinking of spreading lies about the Yogi government, please remove such thoughts from your mind."  

Varadarajan issued a statement to the police asking for a copy of the First Information Report (FIR) and the details of the specific actions that had been grounds for the registration of the cases, the statement was endorsed by the chairman of The Hindu Group, the editorial director of NDTV, the editor of Frontline magazine, the former editor of Jansatta daily, the consulting editor of the India Today Group and various other senior journalists. The founding editors of The Wire described the cases as a politically motivated attack on freedom of the press in India, and a condemnation against the cases was issued by a group of over 200 journalists from various media outlets who described it as "brazen attempt to muzzle the media".

In January 2021, The Wire published a report which was tweeted by Varadarajan and quoted the grandfather of the farmer who had died during the farmers' protest in Delhi. In the report, the grandfather had claimed that his grandson had been shot by the police and that one of the doctors who had performed the autopsy had told him that the injuries he had sustained were caused by a bullet but was prevented from reporting it, in contradiction to the official post mortem report. The police at Rampur, Uttar Pradesh registered an FIR against Varadarajan on charges of public mischief and imputations against national integrity for publishing and tweeting the report. 

Varadarajan described it as malicious prosecution, stating that it has become a crime in the state of Uttar Pradesh to report statements of relatives of the deceased if they questioned the official narration of events. FIRs on similar grounds were also lodged against six other journalists including Vinod Jose of The Caravan which had reported on eyewitness claims that the police had shot the farmer and against the member of parliament Shashi Tharoor. The FIRs received condemnation from various media associations across the country who described it as a symptom of executive overreach.

Personal life 
Varadarajan is married to Nandini Sundar, a sociologist and anthropologist and Professor of Sociology at the Delhi School of Economics.

Works

Books

Articles
 "Global threats and India's quest for strategic space" in Great Powers and Strategic Stability in the 21st Century (Ed: Graeme Herd)

Notes

References

External links
Reality, one bite at a time, official blog
Review of Gujarat: The Making of a Tragedy
List of essays in the book
UNCA award for his reports on IAEA

Charles Glass on Siddharth Varadarajan's argument with the CPJ about Nato bombing in The Spectator
Interview of Siddharth Varadarajan by Dr. Abbas Edalat of the Campaign against Sanctions and Military Intervention in Iran
What's Wrong with Our Afghan War, the Indian Perspective - Interview of Siddharth Varadarajan by Christopher Lydon

1965 births
Living people
Alumni of the London School of Economics
American expatriates in India
American male journalists
American writers of Indian descent
Outlook (Indian magazine) people
The Hindu journalists
Indian American